Magnus Wallin (born 1965 in Kåseberga, Löderup) is a Swedish video artist, working with 3D animation. He is best known for the short film "Exit" (1997).

He participated in the 2001 Venice Biennale.

Notable works
 Anon  (2004)
 Anatomic Flop  (2003)
 Exercise Parade  (2001)
 Skyline  (2000)
 Exit  (1997)

References

External links
Galleri Nordenhake
Magnus Wallin

1965 births
Living people
Swedish video artists
Swedish contemporary artists